Clotilde Elizabeth Brielmaier (March 4, 1867 – March 29, 1915), sometimes called "Lottie" Brielmaier, was a German-American religious painter, specializing in portraits and church murals. She was the daughter of the famous Milwaukee architect Erhard Brielmaier and often collaborated with her family members on projects. She spent several years, as many as twenty, studying at the art centers of Europe including Munich and Rome. She is said to be the first female artist to establish her own studio in the United States, which was located in the now demolished University Building in Milwaukee, Wisconsin.

Her younger brother, architect Leo Anthony Brielmaier, founded the Clotilde Brielmaier Art Scholarship Fund at Cardinal Stritch University in 1964.

Notable Collections and Church Projects 

 Sisters of St. Francis of Assisi, Milwaukee, Wisconsin.
 Milwaukee County Historical Society, Milwaukee, Wisconsin.
 Basilica of St. Josaphat, Milwaukee, Wisconsin.
 Franciscan Church of the Sacred Heart, Indianapolis, Indiana.
 St. Francis Solanus Church, Quincy, Illinois.
 Basilica of St. Francis Xavier, Dyersville, Iowa.

References 

1867 births
1915 deaths
Artists from Milwaukee
People from Piqua, Ohio
Painters from Wisconsin
American muralists
Women muralists
American women painters
19th-century American painters
20th-century American painters
20th-century American women artists
19th-century American women